"Yutang Tabonon" ("Beloved Land") is a Catholic hymn in the Cebuano language, praying for protection of the Filipino people.

The music is Charles Gounod's Marche Pontificale (1869); which is also the music of the Pontifical Anthem, the official anthem of the Pope and of the Holy See. The lyrics were written by Monsignor Rudy Villanueva.  They are not a translation of either the Italian or the Latin lyrics of the Pontifical Anthem.

See also
Lupang Hinirang, the Philippines national anthem

References

Cebuano music
Christian hymns
Year of song unknown